Verolavecchia is a comune in the province of Brescia, in Lombardy. Bordering communes are Borgo San Giacomo, Corte de' Cortesi con Cignone (CR), Pontevico, Quinzano d'Oglio, Robecco d'Oglio (CR) and Verolanuova. Its coat of arms shows three ears of wheat, the text Vetus Virescit and a white cross on blue.

References

Cities and towns in Lombardy